Mitchell Grobb (born June 22, 1984) is a Canadian violinist and multi-instrumentalist.

Biography

Early life

Mitchell grew up in rural Manitoba near the town of Carberry. He started playing the violin at age 5, and was a student in the Suzuki program at Brandon University.

Career

Mitchell frequently performs with Cirque du Soleil, having appeared in several of their major arena and 'Grand Chapiteau' touring shows. He currently performs violin and guitar in the arena world tour of  Ovo.  In the winter of 2015, he played violin in the Grand Chapiteau tour of Corteo during the show's performances in Quito, Ecuador. From 2014 to 2015, he performed violin and guitar in the Grand Chapiteau tour of Ovo for the show's performances in cities across Japan. From 2011 to 2014, he performed violin and electric violin in the arena world tour of Dralion, appearing with the show in 23 countries. He has also performed violin with Cirque du Soleil in the seasonal resident show Wintuk at Madison Square Garden in New York City.

Grobb was a featured member of Barrage from 2002 to 2006. He performed with the group throughout their extensive Vagabond Tales world tour and appears in the Vagabond Tales live concert DVD.

Mitchell was the original violinist and mandolinist in Cape Cod Step Out, a resident show at Tokyo DisneySea in Tokyo, Japan, and he performed violin and accordion with the North American tour of Roseneath Theatre's Spirit Horse .

Discography
This discography is incomplete. It includes some, but not all recordings on which Mitchell Grobb is a guest musician.

 Mitchell Grobb, Part of Me (2000) – fiddle
 The Fantasy Fiddlers, Off the Cuff (2001) – fiddle
 Canadian Grand Masters, Live from the 2002 Competition (2002) – fiddle
 Barrage, Vagabond Tales (2003) – violin, vocals
 Janice Moro, Sometimes (2009) – violin
 James Mann, It's About Time (2012) – violin

Filmography
 Barrage, Vagabond Tales (2003) (DVD) – violin, vocals
 Barrage, The Making of Vagabond Tales (2003) (Documentary) 
 Walt Disney Company, A Magical Gathering (2004) – violin
 Barrage, Running Horses (2005) (Music Video) – violin

References

External links
 

Living people
Canadian classical violinists
Canadian male violinists and fiddlers
Canadian folk fiddlers
Musicians from Manitoba
1984 births
21st-century Canadian violinists and fiddlers
21st-century Canadian male musicians